A list of all Stage Entertainment (Joop Van den Ende Theaterproducties / Stage Holding / Dodger Endemol Theatrical) productions, Stage Entertainment musicals produced by third parties under license are not included.

{| class="wikitable sortable"
!Show
!Country
!Year
!Theater
|-
| rowspan="3" | 3 Musketeers  Original Stage Entertainment Production
| 
| 2003–2004
| Nieuwe Luxor Theater, Rotterdam
|-
| rowspan="2" | 
| 2005–2006
| Stage Theater des Westens, Berlin
|-
| 2006–2008
| Stage Apollo Theater, Stuttgart
|-
| rowspan="3" |42nd Street
|
|2000–2001
|Tour
|-
|
|2001–2005
|Foxwoods Theatre, New York City
|-
|
|2003–2004
| Stage Apollo Theater, Stuttgart
|-
| rowspan="2" |A Chorus Line
|
|2001–2002
|Tour
|-
|
|2019–2020
|Teatro Nazionale, Milan
|-
| rowspan="4" | Aida
| rowspan="2" | 
| 2001–2003
| VSB Circustheater, The Hague
|-
| 2023–present
| AFAS Circustheater, The Hague
|-
| 
| 2003–2005
| Stage Colosseum Theater, Essen
|-
|  
|2005–2007
|Tour
|-
| Aida in Concert
| 
| 2019
| Autotron Den Bosch
|-
| rowspan="4" |Aladdin
| rowspan="2" |
|2015–2019
| Stage Theater Neue Flora, Hamburg
|-
|2019–2023
|Stage Apollo Theater, Stuttgart
|-
|
|2021–2023
|AFAS Circustheater, The Hague
|-
|
|2023–present
|Teatro Coliseum, Madrid
|-
|All Shook Up
|
|2009–2010
|Tour
|-
| rowspan="5" |Anastasia  Original Stage Entertainment Production
| rowspan="2" |
| 2017–2019
| Broadhurst Theatre, New York City
|-
| 2018–2020
| Tour
|-
| 
| 2018–2020
| Teatro Coliseum, Madrid
|-
| 
| 2018–2019
| Stage Palladium Theater, Stuttgart
|-
| 
| 2019–2020
| AFAS Circustheater, The Hague
|-
|Anything Goes
|
|2015
| Tour
|-
| Aspects of Love
| 
| 2012–2013
| Tour
|-
| rowspan="13" | Beauty and the Beast
| rowspan="2" |
| 2005–2007
| Stage Metronom Theater, Oberhausen
|-
| 2007
| Stage Theater am Potzdamer Platz, Berlin
|-
| rowspan="2" |
| 2005–2007
| Tour
|-
| 2015–2016
| AFAS Circustheater, The Hague
|-
|
| 2007
| Tour
|-
| rowspan="3" |
| 2007–2009
| Teatro Coliseum, Madrid
|-
| 2009–2010
| BTM, Barcelona
|-
| 2012–2013
| Tour
|-
| rowspan="2" |
| 2008–2010 
| MDM Theater, Moscow
|-
| 2014–2015
| Rossiya Theatre, Moscow
|-
| rowspan="2" |
| 2009–2010
| Teatro Nazionale, Milan
|-
| 2010–2011
| Theatre Brancaccio, Rome
|-
| 
| 2013–2014
| Théâtre Mogador, Paris
|-
|Barnum
|
|1988–1989
|Tour
|-
|Bat Out Of Hell
|
|2018–2019
|Stage Metronom Theater, Oberhausen
|-
| rowspan="5" | Best of Musical  Original Stage Entertainment Production
| rowspan="5" |
| 2006
| rowspan="5" |Tour
|-
| 2007
|-
|2010
|-
|2012
|-
|2014
|-
|Big Fish
|
|2013
|Neil Simon Theatre, New York City
|-
|Billy Elliot
|
|2014–2015
|AFAS Circustheater, The Hague
|-
|Blood Brothers
|
|1998–1999
|Tour
|-
| rowspan="6" |Blue Man Group
| rowspan="4" |
| 2004–2007
| Stage Theater am Potsdamer Platz, Berlin
|-
| 2007–present
| Stage Bluemax Theater, Berlin
|-
|2007–2008
|Stage Metronom Theater, Oberhausen
|-
| 2008
|Stage Apollo Theater, Stuttgart
|-
|
| 2005–2007
| New London Theater, London
|-
|
| 2006–2007
| Theater Fabriek, Amsterdam
|-
|Boyband
|
|2000–2001
|Tour
|-
|Buddy
|
|2009–2010
|Stage Colosseum Theater, Essen
|-
| rowspan="8" |Cabaret
| rowspan="3" |
| 2003–2006
| Nuevo Teatro Alcalá, Madrid
|-
| 2006–2007
| Tour
|-
| 2007–2008
| Teatre Apolo, Barcelona
|-
| rowspan="2" |
|1989–1990
| rowspan="2" | Koninklijk Theater Carré, Amsterdam
|-
| 2006
|-
| rowspan="3" |
| 2006–2008
| <small>Théâtre des Folies Bergères,’’ Paris</small>
|-
| 2011
| Théâtre Marigny, Paris
|-
| 2012
| Tour
|-
| rowspan="7" |Cats
| rowspan="2" |
| 2001–2002
| Stage Palladium Theater, Stuttgart
|-
| 2002–2004
| Stage Theater am Potsdamer Platz, Berlin
|-
|     
| 2004–2005
| Tour
|-
| 
| 2003–2005
| Teatro Coliseum, Madrid
|-
| 
| 2005–2006
| MDM Theater, Moscow
|-
| 
| 2006–2007
| Tour
|-
| 
| 2015–2016
| Théâtre Mogador, Paris
|-
| rowspan="11" |Chicago
|
|1999–2001
|Beatrix Theater, Utrecht
|-
| rowspan="4" |
|2009–2010
|Teatro Coliseum, Madrid
|-
|2010–2012
|Tour
|-
|2011
|Teatre Tívoli, Barcelona
|-
|2011–2012
|Teatro Nuevo Alcalá, Madrid
|-
| rowspan="2" |
|2013–2014
|MDM Theater, Moscow
|-
|2014
|Rossiya Theatre, Moscow
|-
| rowspan="3" |
|2014–2015
|Stage Palladium Theatre, Stuttgart
|-
| 2015–2016
|Stage Theater des Westens, Berlin
|-
| 2016
|Deutsches Theater, Munich
|-
|
|2018–2019
|Théâtre Mogador, Paris
|-
|Cinderella
|
|2016–2017
|Rossiya Theatre, Moscow
|-
|Cirque Du Soleil Paramour
|
|2019–2020
| Stage Theater Neue Flora, Hamburg
|-
| rowspan="2" |Ciske de Rat Original Stage Entertainment Production| rowspan="2" |
|2007–2009
| rowspan="2" |Tour
|-
|2016–2017
|-
|Copacabana
|
|2002–2003
|Tour
|-
|Crazy for You
|
|2004–2005
|Tour
|-
| rowspan="2" |Cyrano Original Stage Entertainment Production|
|1992–1994
|Tour
|-
|
|1994
|Neil Simon Theatre, New York City
|-
|Das Wunder von Bern  Original Stage Entertainment Production|
|2014–2017
|Stage Theater an der Elbe, Hamburg
|-
| rowspan="2" |De Jantjes
| rowspan="2" |
|1997–1998
|Tour
|-
|2004–2005
|Tour
|-
|De Tweeling Original Stage Entertainment Production|
|2015–2016
|Tour  Co-production with Stichting Theateralliantie and Cook a Dream
|-
|Der Schuh des Manitu Original Stage Entertainment Production|
|2008–2010
|Stage Theater des Westens, Berlin
|-
| rowspan="4" |Dirty Dancing
| rowspan="3" |
|2006–2008
|Stage Theater Neue Flora, Hamburg
|-
|2009–2010
|Stage Theater am Potsdamer Platz, Berlin
|-
|2011–2012
|Stage Metronom Theater, Oberhausen
|-
|
|2008–2009
|Beatrix Theater, Utrecht
|-
|Disney Musical Sing-a-long
|
|2009–2010
|Tour
|-
|Dracula
|
|2004–2005
|Belasco Theatre, New York City
|-
|Dreamgirls
|
|2014–2015**
|Tour
|-
|Droomvlucht Original Stage Entertainment Production|
|2011–2012
|Efteling Theater, Kaatsheuvel  Co-production with Efteling
|-
|Een avond met Dorus Original Stage Entertainment Production|
|2014–2015**
|Tour
|-
| rowspan="2" |Evita
| rowspan="2" |
| 1995–1997
|Tour
|-
| 2005–2007
|Tour
|-
| rowspan="4" |Elisabeth
|
|1999–2001
|VSB Circustheater, The Hague
|-
| rowspan="3" |
|2001–2003
|Stage Colosseum Theater, Essen
|-
|2005–2006
|Stage Apollo Theater, Stuttgart
|-
|2008
|Stage Theater des Westens, Berlin
|-
| rowspan="2" |Elisabeth in Concert
| rowspan="2" |
|2017
|Het Loo Palace, Apeldoorn
|-
|2018
|Paleis Soestdijk, Baarn
|-
|Fame
|
|1999–2000
|Tour
|-
| rowspan="2" |Fiddler on the Roof
| rowspan="2" |
|1998–1999
|Tour
|-
|2017–2018
|Tour  Co-production with Stichting Theateralliantie
|-
| rowspan="2" |Flashdance
| rowspan="2" |
|2010–2011
| rowspan="2" |Teatro Nazionale, Milan
|-
| 2017–2018
|-
|Frozen
|
|2021–present
|Stage Theater an der Elbe, Hamburg
|-
|Funny Girl
|
|1991–1992
|Tour
|-
| rowspan="5" |Ghost
|
|2017–2018 
|MDM Theater, Moscow
|-
| rowspan="3" |
|2017–2018
| Stage Theater des Westens, Berlin
|-
|2018–2019
|Stage Operettenhaus, Hamburg
|-
|2019–2020
|Stage Palladium Theater, Stuttgart
|-
|
|2019
|Théâtre Mogador, Paris
|-
|Good Vibrations
|
|2005
|Eugene O'Neill Theatre, New York City
|-
| rowspan="2" |Grease
|
|2015–2016
| Tour
|-
|
|2017–2018
|Théâtre Mogador, Paris
|-
|Hadestown
|
|2019–present
|Walter Kerr Theatre, New York City
|-
|Hair
|
|2016–2017
|Tour
|-
| rowspan="3" |Hairspray
| rowspan="3" | 
|2007–2010
|Shaftesbury Theatre, London
|-
|2010–2011
|Tour
|-
|2013
|Tour
|-
|Hamilton
|
|2022–present
|Stage Operettenhaus, Hamburg
|-
| rowspan="4" |Heel Holland Zingt Hazes
| rowspan="4" |
|2013
| rowspan="4" |Ziggo Dome, Amsterdam
|-
|2014
|-
|2015
|-
|2016
|-
| rowspan="5" |High School Musical
| rowspan="2" | 
| 2008
|Hammersmith Apollo, London
|-
|2008–2009
|Tour
|-
| rowspan="2" | 
|2008–2009
| Tour
|-
|2008–2009
|Teatro Lope de Vega, Madrid
|-
|
|2009
|Tour
|-
|High School Musical 2
| 
|2009–2010
|Tour
|-
| rowspan="2" |Hij Gelooft in Mij  Original Stage Entertainment Production| rowspan="2" |
|2012–2015
|DeLaMar Theater, Amsterdam
|-
| 2022
|Tour
|-
| rowspan="2" |Hinterm Horizont   Original Stage Entertainment Production| rowspan="2" |
|2011–2016
|Stage Theater am Potsdamer Platz, Berlin
|-
|2016–2017
|Stage Operettenhaus, Hamburg
|-
|I Can't Sing!
|
|2014
|London Palladium, London Co-production with Syco Entertainment
|-
| rowspan="7" |Ich war noch niemals in New York  Original Stage Entertainment Production| rowspan="7" |
|2007–2010
|Stage Operettenhaus, Hamburg
|-
|2010–2012
|Stage Apollo Theater, Stuttgart
|-
|2012–2013
|Stage Metronom Theater, Oberhausen
|-
|2015
|Stage Theater des Westens, Berlin
|-
|2015–2017
|Tour
|-
|2017
|Stage Theater an der Elbe, Hamburg
|-
|2021–2022
|Tour
|-
|Ich will Spaß  Original Stage Entertainment Production|
|2008–2009
|Stage Colosseum Theater, Essen
|-
|Into the Woods
|
|2002
|Broadhurst Theatre, New York City
|-
| rowspan="4" |Jesus Christ Superstar
|  
|2005–2006
|Tour
|-
| rowspan="3" |
|2007–2008
| Teatro Lope de Vega, Barcelona
|-
| 2008–2009
| Tour
|-
| 2009
| Teatre Apolo, Barcelona
|-
|Jersey Boys
|
|2013–2014
|Beatrix Theater, Utrecht
|-
|Joe Original Stage Entertainment Production|
|1997–1998
|Tour
|-
|Joseph and the Amazing Technicolor Dreamcoat
|
| 2008–2010
| Tour
|-
|Kinky Boots
|
|2017–2018
|Stage Operettenhaus, Hamburg
|-
|Ku'Damm 56 Original Stage Entertainment Production|
|2021–2023
|Stage Theater des Westens, Berlin
|-
|La Cage Aux Folles
|
|2010–2011
|DeLaMar Theater, Amsterdam  Tour
|-
|Lazarus
|
|2019–2020
|DeLaMar Theater, Amsterdam
|-
|Love Never Dies
|
|2015–2016
|Stage Operettenhaus, Hamburg
|-
|Love Story
|
|2013–2014
|Tour
|-
| rowspan="3" |Mary Poppins
|
|2010–2011
|Fortis Circustheater, The Hague
|-
| rowspan="2" |
|2016–2018
|Stage Apollo Theater, Stuttgart
|-
|2018–2019
|Stage Theater an der Elbe, Hamburg
|-
| rowspan="2" |Miss Saigon
| rowspan="2" |
|1996–1999
|VSB Circustheater, The Hague
|-
|2011–2012
|Beatrix Theater, Utrecht
|-
|Moeder, ik wil bij de Reveu Original Stage Entertainment Production|
|2014–2015
|Beatrix Theater, Utrecht
|-
| rowspan="2" |Oliver!
|
|1999–2000
|Tour
|-
|
|2011–2013
|Tour
|-
|On Your Feet!
|
|2017–2018
| Beatrix Theater, Utrecht
|-
|Passion
|
|2004–2005
|Tour
|-
|Petticoat Original Stage Entertainment Production|
|2010–2011
|Tour
|-
| rowspan="3" |Pretty Woman
|
|2018–2019
| Nederlander Theatre, New York City
|-
|
|2019–2020
|Stage Theater an der Elbe, Hamburg
|-
|
|2021–2022
|Teatro Nazionale, Milan
|-
|Rebecca
|
|2011–2013
|Stage Palladium Theater, Stuttgart
|-
|Rent
|
|2000–2001
|Tour
|-
|Rex
|
|2001–2002
|Tour
|-
|Robert Long Original Stage Entertainment Production|
|2015–2016**
|Tour
|-
| rowspan="3" |Rocky Original Stage Entertainment Production| rowspan="2" |
| 2012–2015
| Stage Operettenhaus, Hamburg
|-
| 2015–2017
| Stage Palladium Theater, Stuttgart
|-
|
|2014
|Winter Garden Theatre, New York City
|-
|Sonneveld in DeLaMar Original Stage Entertainment Production|
|2015**
|DeLaMar Theater, Amsterdam
|-
|Sunset Boulevard
|
|2008–2009
|Tour
|-
|Sweeney Todd
|
|1993–1994
|Tour
|-
|Sweet Charity
|
|1989–1991
|Tour
|-
| rowspan="2" |The Band
| rowspan="2" |
|2019
|Stage Theater des Westens, Berlin
|-
|2019
|Deutsches Theater, Munich
|-
| rowspan="3" |The Bodyguard
|
|2015–2017
| Beatrix Theater, Utrecht
|-
|
|2017–2018
|Teatro Coliseum, Madrid
|-
|
|2017–2018
| Stage Palladium Theater, Stuttgart
|-
| rowspan="4" |The Hunchback of Notre Dame
| rowspan="4" |
|1999–2002*
|Stage Theater am Potsdamer Platz, Berlin
|-
|2017
|Stage Theater des Westens, Berlin
|-
|2017–2018
| Deutsches Theater, Munich
|-
|2018–2019
| Stage Apollo Theater, Stuttgart
|-
| rowspan="6" |The Lion King
|
|2001–present
|Stage Theater im Hafen, Hamburg
|-
| rowspan="2" |
|2004–2006
|Fortis Circustheater, The Hague
|-
|2016–2019
|AFAS Circustheater, The Hague
|-
| rowspan="2" |
|2007–2010
| rowspan="2" |Théâtre Mogador, Paris
|-
|2021–present
|-
|
|2011–present
|Teatro Lope de Vega, Madrid
|-
| rowspan="2" |The Little Mermaid
|
|2012–2013
| Tour
|-
|
|2012–2014
|Rossiya Theatre, Moscow
|-
| rowspan="6" |Les Misérables
| rowspan="2" |
|1991–1992
| Koninklijk Theater Carré, Amsterdam  VSB Circustheater, The Hague
|-
|2008–2009
| Nieuwe Luxor Theater, Rotterdam  Koninklijk Theater Carré, Amsterdam
|-
| rowspan="4" |
|2010–2011
|Teatro Lope de Vega, Madrid
|-
|2011–2012
|BTM, Barcelona
|-
|2013–2015
|Tour
|-
|2014
|Gran Teatre del Liceu, Barcelona
|-
|Made in Dagenham
|
|2014–2015
|Adelphi Theatre, London
|-
| rowspan="26" |Mamma Mia!
| rowspan="8" |
| 2002–2007
| Stage Operettenhaus, Hamburg
|-
| 2004–2007
| Stage Palladium Theater, Stuttgart
|-
| 2007–2008
| Stage Colosseum Theater, Essen
|- 
| 2007–2009
| Stage Theater am Potsdamer Platz, Berlin
|-
| 2013–2014
| Stage Palladium Theater, Stuttgart
|-
| 2014–2015
| rowspan="2" | Stage Theater des Westens, Berlin
|-
|2019–2020
|-
| 2022–present
| Stage Theater Neue Flora, Hamburg
|-
| rowspan="3" |
| 2004–2007
| Beatrix Theater, Utrecht
|-
| 2010–2011
| Tour
|-
| 2018–2019
| Beatrix Theater, Utrecht
|-
| rowspan="7" |
| 2004–2007
| Teatro Lope de Vega, Madrid
|-
| 2007–2009
| BTM, Barcelona
|-
| 2009–2011
| Tour
|-
| 2010–2010
| Teatro Coliseum, Madrid
|-
| 2015–2016
| Teatre Tívoli, Barcelona
|-
| 2016–2017
| Tour
|-
| 2017
| Teatro Coliseum, Madrid
|-
| 
| 2006
| Stadsschouwburg, Antwerp
|-
| rowspan="2" | 
| 2010–2011
|Teatro Nazionale, Milan
|-
| 2011–2012
|Teatro Brancaccio, Rome
|-
| rowspan="3" |
| 2010–2012
| Théâtre Mogador, Paris
|-
| 2012–2014
| Tour
|-
| 2023–present
| Casino de Paris, Paris
|-
| rowspan="2" | 
| 2006–2008
| rowspan="2" | MDM Theater, Moscow
|-
| 2013–2013
|-
|Mozart!
|
|2001–2002
|Stage Theater Neue Flora, Hamburg
|-
| rowspan="3" |Musicals in Ahoy Original Stage Entertainment Production| rowspan="3" |
|2002
| rowspan="3" |Ahoy, Rotterdam
|-
|2004
|-
|2006
|-
| rowspan="3" |My Fair Lady
| rowspan="2" |
|1994–1995
|Tour
|-
|2006–2007
|Tour
|-
|
|2012
|Tour
|-
|Next to Normal
|
|2012
|Tour  Co-production with M-Lab
|-
| rowspan="6" |The Phantom of the Opera
| rowspan="3" |
|2002–2004
| Stage Palladium Theater, Stuttgart
|-
|2005–2007
|Stage Colosseum Theater, Essen
|-
|2013–2015
| Stage Theater Neue Flora, Hamburg
|-
|
|1993–1996
|VSB Circustheater, The Hague
|-
|
| 2002–2004
| Teatro Lope de Vega, Madrid
|-
|
|2014–2016
| MDM Theatre, Moscow
|-
| rowspan="2" |The Producers
|
|2006–2007
|Teatro Coliseum, Madrid
|-
|
|2021–present
|Théâtre de Paris, Paris  Co-production with ACME, Alexis Michalik, Art Live and Théâtre de Paris
|-
|Romeo und Julia
|
|2023–present
|Stage Theater des Westens, Berlin
|-
| rowspan="5" |Saturday Night Fever
| rowspan="2" |
|2001–2003
| Beatrix Theater, Utrecht
|-
|2012
|Tour
|-
| rowspan="2" |
|2009
|Teatro Coliseum, Madrid
|-
|2009–2010
|Tour
|-
|
|2012-2013
|Teatro Nazionale, Milan
|-
| rowspan="4" | Singin' in the Rain
| rowspan="2" |
|2012–2013
| Palace Theatre, London
|-
|2013–2014
|Tour
|-
|
|2015–2016
| Rossiya Theatre, Moscow
|-
|
|2019–2020
|Teatro Nazionale, Milan
|-
| rowspan="17" |Sister Act  Original Stage Entertainment Production| rowspan="2" |
|2009–2010 
| London Palladium, London
|-
|2011–2012
| Tour
|-
| rowspan="4" |
| 2010–2012
| Stage Operettenhaus, Hamburg
|-
| 2012–2013
| Stage Apollo Theater, Stuttgart
|-
| 2013–2015
| Stage Metronom Theater, Oberhausen
|-
|2016–2017
| Tour
|-
| rowspan="3" |
| 2011–2012
| Broadway Theatre, New York City
|-
| 2012–2014
| 1st Tour
|-
| 2014–2015
| 2nd Tour
|-
| rowspan="2" |
|2011–2012
|Teatro Nazionale, Milan
|-
|2022–2023
|Teatro Nazionale, Milan
|-
|
|2012–2013
|Théâtre Mogador, Paris
|-
|
| 2013–2014
| AFAS Circustheater, The Hague
|-
| rowspan="3" |
|2014–2015
|Teatre Tívoli, Barcelona
|-
|2015–2016
|Tour
|-
| 2016
|Nuevo Teatro Alcalá, Madrid
|-
|
|
|
|-
| rowspan="4" |The Sound of Music
| rowspan="3" |
| 2002–2004
| Tour
|-
| 2014–2015**
| Tour
|-
| 2021–2022
| Tour
|-
| 
| 2011–2012
| MDM Theater, Moscow
|-
| Spring Awakening
|
|2011
| Tour Co-production with M-Lab
|-
| rowspan="14" |Strictly Come Dancing Live!
| rowspan="14" |
|2008
| rowspan="14" | Tour
|-
|2009
|-
|2010
|-
|2011
|-
|2012
|-
|2013
|-
|2014
|-
|2015
|-
|2016
|-
|2017
|-
|2018
|-
|2019
|-
|2020
|-
|2022
|-
| rowspan="15" |Tanz der Vampire
| rowspan="13" |
|2003–2003
| Stage Apollo Theater, Stuttgart
|-
| 2003–2006
| Stage Theater Neue Flora, Hamburg
|-
| 2006–2008
| Stage Theater des Westens, Berlin
|-
| 2008–2010
| Stage Metronom Theater, Oberhausen
|-
| 2010–2011
| Stage Palladium Theater, Stuttgart
|-
| 2011–2013
| Stage Theater des Westens, Berlin
|-
| 2016 
| Stage Theater des Westens, Berlin
|-
|2016–2017
| Deutsches Theater, Munich
|-
|2017–2018
| Stage Theater an der Elbe, Hamburg
|-
| 2018
| Musical Dome, Cologne
|-
|2018–2019
| Stage Theater des Westens, Berlin
|-
|2019–2020
| Stage Metronom Theater, Oberhausen
|-
|2020–2023
|Stage Palladium Theater, Stuttgart
|-
|
|2014–2015
| Théâtre Mogador, Paris
|-
|
| 2016–2017
| MDM Theater, Moscow
|-
| rowspan="5" |Tarzan
|
|2007–2009
| Fortis Circustheater, The Hague
|-
| rowspan="4" |
|2008–2013
| Stage Theater Neue Flora, Hamburg
|-
|2013–2016
| Stage Apollo Theater, Stuttgart
|-
|2016–2018
| Stage Metronom Theater, Oberhausen
|-
|2023–present
|Stage Palladium Theater, Stuttgart
|-
| rowspan="7" |Tina  Original Stage Entertainment Production| 
| 2018–present
| Aldwych Theatre, London
|-
| rowspan="2" | 
| 2019–2022
| Stage Operettenhaus, Hamburg
|- 
| 2023–present
|Stage Palladium Theater, Stuttgart
|-
| rowspan="2" |
| 2019–2022
| Lunt-Fontanne Theatre, New York City
|-
| 2022–present
| Tour
|-
|
|2020–2023
|Beatrix Theater, Utrecht
|-
|
|2021–2023
|Teatro Coliseum, Madrid
|-
| rowspan="3" |Titanic
|
|1997–1999
|Lunt-Fontanne Theatre, New York City
|-
|
|2001–2002
|Tour
|-
|
|2002–2003
|Stage Theater Neue Flora, Hamburg
|-
|Tsjechov
|
|1992–1993
|Tour
|-
|Urinetown
|
|2010–2011
|Tour  Co-production with M-Lab and Opus One
|-
| rowspan="2" |Victor/Victoria
|
|1995–1997
|Marquis Theater, New York City
|-
|
|2005–2006
|Teatro Coliseum, Madrid
|-
| rowspan="2" |War Horse
|
| 2013
| Stage Theater des Westens, Berlin
|-
|
| 2014–2015
| Tour
|-
|Was getekend, Annie M.G. Schmidt Original Stage Entertainment Production|
|2017–2019
|Tour  DeLaMar Theater, Amsterdam
|-
| rowspan="3" |We Will Rock You
| rowspan="2" |
|2008–2010
|Stage Apollo Theater, Stuttgart
|-
|2010–2011
|Stage Theater des Westens, Berlin
|-
|
|2010–2011
|Beatrix Theater, Utrecht
|-
|West Side Story
|
|1996–1998
|Tour
|-
| rowspan="4" |Wicked
| rowspan="3" |
| 2007–2010
| Stage Palladium Theater, Stuttgart
|-
| 2010–2011
| Stage Metronom Theater, Oberhausen
|-
| 2021–2022
| Stage Theater Neue Flora, Hamburg
|-
|
|2011–2013
| AFAS Circustheater, The Hague
|-
|The Wiz
| 
| 2006–2007
| Beatrix Theater, Utrecht
|-
| rowspan="3" |Zorro
|
|2009–2010
|Théâtre des Folies Bergères, Paris
|-
||
|2010–2011
| MDM Theater, Moscow
|-
|
|2011–2012
|Tour
|}

 * Production taken over from Stella AG.
 ** Production taken over from Albert Verlinde Entertainment''

References

Entertainment lists